Chrome Engine is a proprietary 3D game engine developed by Techland. The current version, Chrome Engine 6, supports Mac OS X, Linux, Xbox One, PlayStation 4, Xbox 360, PlayStation 3 and Microsoft Windows.

Chrome Engine evolved through over nine years of development. According to its creators the engine allows substantial control over the process of creating game levels.

Versions

Chrome Engine 1
First release of the engine used in Chrome.

Chrome Engine 2
Improved version of engine enhanced with support for DirectX 9.0.

Chrome Engine 3
This version of the engine underwent significant modifications. DirectX 9.0c and DirectX 10 support, HDR, shaders and bump mapping were implemented.

Chrome Engine 4
The fourth iteration of the Chrome Engine that was introduced with Call of Juarez: Bound in Blood. Supports DirectX 9 only.

Chrome Engine 5
This version debuted with Call of Juarez: The Cartel, Call of Juarez: Gunslinger and Dead Island. This version was primarily used between 2011-2013.

Chrome Engine 6
Version used since 2013 to develop Dying Light and DLC fot Dying Light Hellraid.

Games using Chrome Engine

Chrome Engine 1 
Pet Racer (2002)
 FIM Speedway Grand Prix (2003)
Chrome (2003)
Chrome: SpecForce (2005)
Crazy Soccer Mundial (2006)

Chrome Engine 2 
Xpand Rally (2004)
Xpand Rally Xtreme (2006)
Terrorist Takedown: War in Colombia (2006)
Terrorist Takedown: Covert Ops (2006)
GTI Racing (2006)
FIM Speedway Grand Prix 2 (2006)
Expedition Trophy: Murmansk Vladivostok (2006)
UAZ 4X4 Racing (2007)
Full Drive: UAZ 4x4 – Ural Appeal (2007)
Classic Car Racing (2007)
Code of Honor: The French Foreign Legion (2007)
Full Drive 2: UAZ 4x4 (2008)
4x4: Hummer (2008)
Full Drive 2: Daurian Marathon (2008)
Full Drive 2: Siberian Appeal (2008)
Battlestrike: Force of Resistance (2008)
Sniper: Art of Victory (2008)
Nikita Tajemnica Skarbu Piratów (2008)
GM Rally (2009)
KrAZ (2010)
Full Drive 2: Trophy Murmansk - Vladivostok 2 (2010)
Warhound (project suspended)

Chrome Engine 3 
Call of Juarez (2006)
FIM Speedway Grand Prix 3 (2008)
Speedway Liga (2009)
FIM Speedway Grand Prix 4 (2011)

Chrome Engine 4 
Call of Juarez: Bound in Blood (2009)
Sniper: Ghost Warrior (2010)
Nail'd (2010)
Mad Riders (2012)

Chrome Engine 5 
Call of Juarez: The Cartel (2011)
Dead Island (2011)
Dead Island: Riptide (2013)
Call of Juarez: Gunslinger (2013)

Chrome Engine 6 
Dying Light (2015)
Dead Island Definitive Edition (2016)
Dead Island: Riptide Definitive Edition (2016)
Hellraid (2020)

References

2003 software
Video game development software
Video game engines